Alexander Jerome Gould (born May 4, 1994) is an American actor. He is best known for voicing the title character of the Pixar animated film Finding Nemo. He is also known for playing Shane Botwin on the Showtime drama series Weeds.

Personal life 
Gould was born in Los Angeles, California. His younger sisters Emma and Kelly were actresses. Gould practices Judaism, and was active in the Conservative Jewish youth group United Synagogue Youth.

Following filming of the final season of Weeds in Spring 2012, Gould participated in Nativ, a gap year program, and lived in Israel for almost a year, then went to college at Clark University in 2013. Gould later transferred to Brandeis University, and graduated from in 2017 with a dual major in philosophy and politics.

Gould married Lieba Hall in June 2018. They live in Los Angeles.

Career 
Gould's acting career began when he was two years old. He had small roles in the late 1990s and early 2000s on many television shows that were popular at the time. At age seven, he won the eponymous role in Finding Nemo. He then played David Collins in the remake of the soap opera Dark Shadows, but the pilot episode was rejected by The WB.

From ages ten to eighteen, Gould was part of the cast of Weeds on Showtime. He starred in all eight seasons as Shane Botwin. For his role, he was nominated twice for Outstanding Performance by an Ensemble in a Comedy Series at the SAG Awards. During his tenure, he also had guest roles in other shows, was part of the ensemble cast of the 2006 film How to Eat Fried Worms, and voiced Bambi in Bambi II.

In 2012, Gould stepped away from his acting career to attend college, among other pursuits. He had two small voice acting roles during this period, Jimmy Olsen in the 2013 animated film Superman: Unbound and a cameo in 2016's Finding Dory. In 2018, he joined the Abrams Acting Agency.

Filmography

Film

Television

Awards and nominations

References

External links 
 

1994 births
20th-century American male actors
21st-century American male actors
American male child actors
American male film actors
American male voice actors
Jewish American male actors
Male actors from Los Angeles
Living people
21st-century American Jews